Cañete de las Torres is a city located in the province of Córdoba, Spain. According to the 2006 census (INE), the city had a population of 3,211 inhabitants.

References

External links
Cañete de las Torres - Sistema de Información Multiterritorial de Andalucía

Municipalities in the Province of Córdoba (Spain)